Steve Paul-Ambrose (born 1983) is a poker player from Ontario, Canada who won the 2006 PokerStars Caribbean Poker Adventure (PCA), earning $1,388,600. At the time a World Poker Tour event,  he won his PCA entry through an online $102 satellite tournament on PokerStars. He used to be a member of PokerStars Team Pro.

Paul-Ambrose is a 2007 graduate from the University of Waterloo, in Waterloo, Ontario, Canada, where he studied business and science.

World Series of Poker 
Paul-Ambrose has four cashes at the World Series of Poker with his best finish to date in the $5,000 World Championship Mixed Hold'em (Limit/No-Limit) event where he came in fourth, earning $146,259, with a final table made up of such notables as Jon Turner, Kirk Morrison (poker player), the runner-up Greg Mueller, and Steve Billirakis the winner.

As of 2009, his total live tournament winnings exceed $1,800,000.

See also 
 List of University of Waterloo people

References

External links 
 Team PokerStars profile
 PokerListings TV Interview

1983 births
Canadian poker players
Living people
World Poker Tour winners